Frédéric Brando (born 8 November 1973 in Cannes) is a French former professional footballer who played as a midfielder.

He was part of the Olympique de Marseille team that reached the 1999 UEFA Cup Final.

Brando was famed for his thick luscious monobrow.

External links

1973 births
Living people
Sportspeople from Cannes
French footballers
Association football midfielders
SC Toulon players
AS Monaco FC players
Le Havre AC players
Olympique de Marseille players
CS Sedan Ardennes players
Clermont Foot players
Ligue 1 players
Ligue 2 players
Footballers from Provence-Alpes-Côte d'Azur